Haider is a 2014 Indian crime-drama film directed by Vishal Bhardwaj, and produced by Bhardwaj and Siddharth Roy Kapur. The film stars Shahid Kapoor as the eponymous protagonist, and co-stars Tabu, Kay Kay Menon, Shraddha Kapoor, and Irrfan Khan. Bhardwaj wrote the dialogues for the film, and co-wrote the screenplay with Basharat Peer. Bhardwaj also composed the music and Gulzar wrote the lyrics. The film is a modern-day adaptation of William Shakespeare's tragedy Hamlet, and tells the story of Haider who searches for his missing father during the Kashmir conflict of 1995.

The film garnered awards and nominations in several categories, with particular praise for its direction, performances of Shahid Kapoor and Tabu, music and production design. As of June 2015, the film has won 36 awards.

At the 62nd National Film Awards, Haider earned five awards, more than any other film at the ceremony, including Best Music Direction and Best Screenplay (Dialogues) (both Bhardwaj). Haider also won five awards at the 60th Filmfare Awards ceremony, including Best Actor (Shahid Kapoor), Best Supporting Actor (Menon), and Best Supporting Actress (Tabu). It also received nominations for Best Film and Best Director at the ceremony. At the 2015 Screen Awards, Haider received nominations for Best Film and Best Director, and won five awards, including Best Actor and Best Supporting Actress. Haider also won nine awards at the 16th ceremony of the International Indian Film Academy Awards, including Best Actor and Best Supporting Actress.

Accolades

See also
 List of Bollywood films of 2014

Footnotes

References

External links
 Accolades for Haider at the Internet Movie Database

Lists of accolades by Indian film